Black Republic (lit. "They Also Are Like Us") is a 1990 South Korean film directed by Park Kwang-su.

Plot
A social drama about a young student activist who hides from the authorities by working in a small mining town.

Cast
Moon Sung-keun as Kim Ki-young
Park Joong-hoon as Lee Seon-cheol
Shim Hye-jin as Song Young-sook
Hwang Hae as Shim
Park Gyu-chae as Lee Sa-jang
Lee Ill-woong as Jeong
Yang Jin-yeong as Dae-shik
Kim Min-hee as Mi-sook
Kim Kyung-ran as Taek-i's mother
Cho Ju-mi as Soon-i's mother

Awards
Blue Dragon Film Awards (1990) Best Film
Singapore International Film Festival (1991) Silver Screen Award for Best Asian Feature Film

References

Bibliography

External links

Best Picture Blue Dragon Film Award winners
1990s Korean-language films
South Korean drama films
Films directed by Park Kwang-su
1990 drama films